Tsapournia is a village and a community of the Elassona municipality. Before the 2011 local government reform it was a part of the municipality of Sarantaporo, of which it was a municipal district. The 2011 census recorded 179 inhabitants in the village and 335 in the community. The community of Tsapournia covers an area of 27.197 km2.

History
The settlement is recorded as village and as "Çapurna" and as "Mavrolithari" in the Ottoman Maliyeden Müdevver Defter number 66 dating to 1470.

Administrative division
The community of Tsapournia consists of two settlements:
 Farmaki and
 Tsapournia.

Economy
The population of Tsapournia is occupied in animal husbandry and agriculture.

Population
According to the 2011 census, the population of the settlement of Tsapournia was 179 people, a decrease of almost 3% compared with the population of the previous census of 2001.

See also
 List of settlements in the Larissa regional unit

References

Populated places in Larissa (regional unit)